Arseniosiderite is a rare arsenate mineral formed by the oxidation of other arsenic-containing minerals, such as scorodite or arsenopyrite. It occurs in association with beudantite, carminite, dussertite, pharmacolite, pitticite, adamite and erythrite. The name arseniosiderite reflects two major elements of the mineral, arsenic and iron (Greek sideros means iron).

References

Arsenate minerals
Monoclinic minerals
Minerals in space group 15